Jackson Ferris (born 25 February 1998) is a professional rugby league footballer who plays as a .

He previously played for the Cronulla-Sutherland Sharks in the National Rugby League.

Background
Ferris played his junior rugby league for the Takaro Taniwha and Gymea Gorillas.

Career

2020
Ferris made his first grade debut in round 12 of the 2020 NRL season for Cronulla-Sutherland against the Brisbane Broncos.  He scored a try on debut in a 36–26 victory.

2022
Ferris played for Glebe in the Ron Massey Cup during 2022. On 16 December, Ferris signed a train and trial contract with Manly ahead of the 2023 NRL season.

References

1998 births
Living people
Cronulla-Sutherland Sharks players
New Zealand rugby league players
New Zealand Māori rugby league players
Newtown Jets NSW Cup players
Rugby league centres
Rugby league players from Palmerston North